Filip Mitrović (born 17 November 1993) is a Montenegrin football player who plays for Sutjeska Nikšić.

Club career
He made his debut in the Russian Football National League for FC Tyumen on 10 March 2019 in a game against FC Tambov.

References

External links
 
 
 Profile by Russian Football National League

1993 births
Living people
Footballers from Podgorica
Association football central defenders
Montenegrin footballers
Montenegro under-21 international footballers
OFK Titograd players
FK Bokelj players
FK Mogren players
FK Budućnost Podgorica players
FK Rudar Pljevlja players
FC Tyumen players
AFC Chindia Târgoviște players
FK Novi Pazar players
FK Kom players
FK Sutjeska Nikšić players
OFK Bačka players
Montenegrin First League players
Russian First League players
Serbian First League players
Montenegrin expatriate footballers
Expatriate footballers in Russia
Montenegrin expatriate sportspeople in Russia
Expatriate footballers in Romania
Montenegrin expatriate sportspeople in Romania
Expatriate footballers in Serbia
Montenegrin expatriate sportspeople in Serbia